Köhnə Gəgir (also, Këgna Gegir and Konagager) a village and the least populous municipality in the Lankaran Rayon of Azerbaijan. It has a population of 274.

References 

Populated places in Lankaran District